John Bell is a Scottish former professional association footballer, who played as a forward. Born in Tannochside, Lanarkshire, the start of his playing career coincided with the First World War, and Bell played army football during the war. Following the resumption of peacetime football, Bell played in the Scottish Leagues for Dundee, Albion Rovers and Hamilton Academical, before moving to Wales to play for Newport County, and later to England with Hertfordshire-based Watford. He made 20 Football League and one FA Cup appearance while at Watford, scoring 6 goals.

References

Dundee F.C. players
Albion Rovers F.C. players
Hamilton Academical F.C. players
Newport County A.F.C. players
Watford F.C. players
Scottish footballers
English Football League players
Year of birth missing
Year of death missing
Association football forwards